Seh Tapan or Sehtapan may refer to:
 Seh Tapan, Kermanshah
 Seh Tapan Aziz, Kermanshah Province
 Seh Tapan Salim, Kermanshah Province
 Sehtapan, Kurdistan